The laying on of hands is a religious practice. In Judaism semikhah ("leaning [of the hands]") accompanies the conferring of a blessing or authority.

In Christian churches, chirotony is used as both a symbolic and formal method of invoking the Holy Spirit primarily during baptisms and confirmations, healing services, blessings, and ordination of priests, ministers, elders, deacons, and other church officers, along with a variety of other church sacraments and holy ceremonies.

A similar practice of laying on of hands is also used in Navajo religious ceremonies.

Jewish tradition

The laying on of hands was an action referred to on numerous occasions in the Hebrew Bible to accompany the conferring of a blessing or authority.
Moses ordained Joshua through semikhah—i.e. by the laying on of hands: , . The Bible adds that Joshua was thereby "filled with the spirit of wisdom". Moses also ordained the 70 elders. The elders later ordained their successors in this way. Their successors in turn ordained others. This chain of hands-on semikhah continued through the time of the Second Temple, to an undetermined time.  The exact date that the original semikhah succession ended is not certain.  Many medieval authorities believed that this occurred during the reign of Hillel II, circa 360 CE.  However, it seems to have continued at least until 425 CE when Theodosius II executed Gamaliel VI and suppressed the Patriarchate and Sanhedrin.

Laying on of hands can also refer to the practice of laying hands over one's sacrificial animal (sin-offering), before it was slaughtered, based on a teaching in Leviticus 4:24: "And he shall lay his hand upon the head of the goat." In Pseudo Jonathan's Aramaic translation of the Pentateuch, the translator of the verse explains its sense: "And he shall lay his right hand with force on the head of the goat." According to Philo of Alexandria, the custom of laying on of hands was done in conjunction with a declaration, where the owner of the animal would say: "These hands have not taken a bribe to distort justice, neither have they divided the spoil, etc." According to Jewish tradition, the first dispute in Israel concerned whether or not it was permissible to lay hands upon one's sacrificial animal by applying one's full body weight on a Festival Day.

Christian traditions

In the New Testament the laying on of hands was associated with the receiving of the Holy Spirit (see Acts ). Initially the Apostles laid hands on new believers as well as believers (see ).

The New Testament also associates the laying on of hands with the conferral of authority or designation of a person to a position of responsibility. Also possibly Acts , where "ordained"—Greek: —may be translated "extended the hand".) The use of the laying on of hands for the ordination of church officers has continued in many branches of Christianity.

Anglicanism 
Laying on of hands is part of Anglican confirmation, anointing of the sick, and other parts of liturgy and pastoral offices.
The rubric in the confirmation service requires the bishop to lay only one hand, symbolising that he has less spiritual authority than an apostle who laid both hands.

Catholicism 
In the Roman Catholic Church, the practice continued and is still used in a wide variety of church ceremonies, such as during confirmation.

Eastern Christianity 
In Eastern Christianity, laying on of hands is used for the ordination (called ) of the higher clergy (bishops, priests and deacons), and is also performed at the end of the sacrament of unction.

Evangelicalism 

In Evangelical Christianity, the laying on of hands takes place for pastoral ordination.

Baptists 
In few Baptist churches, the laying on of hands rarely takes place after a believer's baptism although this is traditional to some sects and not practiced as a Biblical command nor example. This is one of the two points which was added in the 1689 Baptist Confession of Faith in 1742. Southern Baptist Christians employ the laying on of hands during the ordination of clergymen (such as deacons, assistant, and senior pastors) as well as situations of calling for divine healing.

Pentecostalism 
Pentecostal Christians practice the laying on of hands as part of prayer for divine healing (faith healing) and the anointing of the sick. Former Australia Prime Minister Scott Morrison practises the laying on of hands.

Latter-day Saints 

Members of the Church of Jesus Christ of Latter-day Saints believe the restoration of Christ's priesthood came about by the laying on of hands by the resurrected John the Baptist to Joseph Smith and Oliver Cowdery in 1829, and laying on of hands is seen as a necessary part of Confirmation.  Latter-day Saints lay on hands when ordaining members to to the Aaronic and Melchizedek priesthoods and when setting members apart to serve in other positions in the church.  When asked by a member who is ill, two elders of the Church anoint the sick member's head with consecrated olive oil and then lay hands upon their head and as guided by the Holy Spirit, bless them.

African traditional medicine 
The San peoples of Southern Africa use the laying on of hands as a healing practice. As described by professor Richard Katz, the healers of the !Kung people lay their hands on a sick person to draw the sickness out of them and into the healer in a "difficult, painful" process.

State use

The laying on of hands, known as the royal touch, was performed by kings in England and France, and was believed to cure scrofula (also called "King's Evil" at the time), a name given to a number of skin diseases. The rite of the king's touch began in France with Robert II the Pious, but legend later attributed the practice to Clovis as Merovingian founder of the Holy Roman kingdom, and Edward the Confessor in England. The belief continued to be common throughout the Middle Ages but began to die out with the Enlightenment. Queen Anne was the last British monarch to claim to possess this divine ability, though the Jacobite pretenders also claimed to do so. The French monarchy maintained the practice up until the 19th century. The act was usually performed at large ceremonies, often at Easter or other holy days.

See also

Anointing
Exorcism
Faith healing
Gifts of healing
Gift of miracles
Holy anointing oil
Hypnosis
Manual therapy
Ordination
Pneumatology
Priesthood blessing
Reiki
Right hand of Christian fellowship
Snake handling
Speaking in tongues
Spiritual gift
Spirituality
Superstition
Thaumaturgy
Scott Morrison

Notes

References
 New Bible Dictionary

 
 

 

Religious rituals